Lloyd Hywel Evans (born 9 January 1945) is a British former competitive figure skater who competed in men's singles. He is a two-time British national champion (1964 and 1965) and finished 18th at the 1964 Winter Olympics.

Results

References

1945 births
Living people
British male single skaters
Welsh single skaters
Olympic figure skaters of Great Britain
Figure skaters at the 1964 Winter Olympics
People from Rhondda